
Cheval Blanc is a restaurant in Heemstede in the Netherlands. It is a fine dining restaurant that is awarded one Michelin star in the period 2007–present. The restaurant was awarded a Bib Gourmand in the period 2002–2006.

GaultMillau awarded the restaurant 13 out of 20 points in 2013.

Head chef of Cheval Blanc is Huub van der Velden.

See also
List of Michelin starred restaurants in the Netherlands

References 

Restaurants in the Netherlands
Michelin Guide starred restaurants in the Netherlands